Gurawara (or Guraora) is in Rewari tehsil of Rewari district, Haryana, India. Gurawara Fort is a local landmark. Under CSC, it became first digital village of India.

52.78%  of the population and females (2884) 47.21%.a Gurawra has an average literacy (4136) rate of 67.71%, lower than the national average of 74%: male literacy (2475) is 59.84%, and female literacy (1661) is 40.15% of total literates (4136). In Gurawra, Rewari, 11.13% of the population is under 6 years of age (680).

Adjacent villages
 Palhawas
 Kulana
 Jiwara 
 Ratanthal
 Kanhori
 Patoda

References

Villages in Rewari district